Jeff Landau (born January 9, 1974) is a former American professional tennis player from Ridgefield, Connecticut. He was a four-year starter on the Wake Forest University tennis team, where he won the 1994 United States Amateur Championships (Men's Tennis). The right-hander reached his highest singles ATP ranking of 1325 on August 10, 1998. He now works at BSJ as a tennis coach and continues to develop and nurture the lives of future young tennis players.

External links 

 Tennis Server article on playing college tennis 

1974 births
Living people
Wake Forest Demon Deacons men's tennis players
People from Ridgefield, Connecticut
American male tennis players
Tennis people from Connecticut